Ilsanseo-gu (literally “Western Ilsan district”) is a district in Goyang, Gyeonggi-do, South Korea.  Ilsan-gu was divided into Ilsandong-gu and Ilsanseo-gu on May 16, 2005.

Administration
Ilsanseo-gu is divided into 9 dong (동, "neighborhoods"):

 Ilsan 1(il), 2(i) and 3(sam)-dong (일산1, 2, 3동)
 Tanhyeon-dong (탄현동)
 Juyeop 1(il) and 2(i)-dong (주엽1, 2동)
 Daehwa-dong (대화동)
 Songpo-dong (송포동) [contain Beopgot-dong (법곳동)]
 Songsan-dong (송산동) [divided into Gusan-dong and Gajwa-dong (구산동, 가좌동)]
 Deogi-dong (덕이동)

Education
Ilsanseo-gu has 46 schools including: 22 elementary schools, 12 middle schools, 9 high schools, and 2 special schools.

Hugok (후곡) is notable for their hagwons (학원, "cram school"), and many hagwons are present in the region.

References

External links 
 Ilsanseo-gu office website (Western Ilsan district) 

Goyang
Districts in Gyeonggi Province